Epacris purpurascens is a species of flowering plant in the heath family Ericaceae and is endemic to eastern New South Wales. It is an erect shrub with egg-shaped or heart-shaped, sharply-pointed leaves and white or pink, tube-shaped flowers.

Description
The leaves are concave and taper to a sharp, bristly point.

Taxonomy and naming
Epacris purpurascens was first formally described in 1809 by John Sims in Curtis's Botanical Magazine from an unpublished description by Joseph Banks. The specific epithet (purpurascens) means "becoming purple".

In 1824, Joachim Conrad Loddiges, George Loddiges and William Loddiges described two varieties of E. purpurescens and in 1901 Joseph Maiden and Ernst Betche reduced Epacris onosmiflora A.Cunn. to E. purpurascens var. onosmiflora. The names of the following varieties are accepted by the Australian Plant Census:
 Epacris purpurascens var. onosmiflora (A.Cunn.) It mainly flowers in October and November.
It flowers from July to September.

Distribution and habitat
This epacris grows in forest and scrub near creeks and swamps in eastern New South Wales. The variety onosmiflora is restricted to the Blue Mountains and var. purpurascens grows on coastal plateaus in the Sydney and Gosford districts.

References

purpurascens
Ericales of Australia
Flora of New South Wales
Plants described in 1809
Taxa named by John Sims (taxonomist)